Dennis John (27 January 1935 – 12 April 2013) was a Welsh professional footballer who played for Plymouth Argyle, Swansea Town, Scunthorpe United and Millwall.

John was part of the Millwall squad that went unbeaten in 59 consecutive league matches at home, a record at the time, from 24 August 1964 until 14 January 1967.

References

1935 births
2013 deaths
Footballers from Swansea
Welsh footballers
Association football fullbacks
Plymouth Argyle F.C. players
Swansea City A.F.C. players
Scunthorpe United F.C. players
Millwall F.C. players
English Football League players